Counterpoints: Live in Tokyo is a live album by jazz pianist McCoy Tyner released on the Milestone label in 2004. It was recorded, along with Passion Dance (1978), in July 1978 at the Live Under the Sky festival in Tokyo, Japan and features performances by Tyner with drummer Tony Williams and bassist Ron Carter.

Reception
The Allmusic review by Ken Dryden states "Even with Tyner's fierce attack at the keyboard and his heavy use of the sustain pedal at times, the sound is remarkably clear".

Track listing 
 "The Greeting" – 11:30  
 "Aisha" – 7:08  
 "Sama Layuca" – 6:38  
 "Prelude to a Kiss" (Ellington, Gordon, Mills) – 9:20  
 "Iki Masho (Let's Go)" – 13:58  
All compositions by McCoy Tyner except as indicated
 Recorded at "Live Under The Sky", Denen Colosseum, Tokyo, Japan, July 28, 1978

Personnel 
 McCoy Tyner – piano
 Ron Carter – bass (tracks 1, 4 & 5)  
 Tony Williams – drums

References 

Albums produced by Orrin Keepnews
2004 live albums
McCoy Tyner live albums
Milestone Records live albums